Objective Media Group (OMG), previously known as Objective Productions, is a media company that produces shows in comedy, comedy drama, entertainment, factual entertainment and Magic. It has produced shows including The Cube, Breaking Magic, The Real Hustle, Peep Show, Fresh Meat, and Toast of London. The company has offices in Glasgow, Scotland and Los Angeles, California.

Objective has won a number of awards including BAFTA, RTS Awards, British Comedy Awards, Rose d'Or, Monte Carlo Golden Nymphs and the South Bank Show.

Companies

Part of All3media, Objective Media Group is composed of the following companies:
Betty  A joint-venture with All3media
Objective Fiction (scripted comedies and comedy-dramas)
Tannadice Pictures (joint venture with Neil Forsyth)
OMG America (Los Angeles, California, American division)
OMG North/Purple Productions (Manchester, England, run by Pam Cavannagh and Dympna Jackson)
OMG Scotland (Glasgow, nations hub)
Triple Brew Media (big-scale studio shows, both live and recorded, quiz and gameshow programming)
141 Productions
Canard

Current productions 
 The Larkins (2021 TV series)
 The Cube
 Lingo
 Witless
 The Answer Trap
 Stupid Man, Smart Phone
 GameFace
 Toast of London
 Britain Today Tonight
 Now You See It
 It Was Alright in the 70s
 United Shades of America
 Is OJ Innocent? The Missing Evidence
 The Arrangement

Past productions 
 The Quick Trick Show
 The Incredible Mr. Goodwin
 Peep Show
 Tom and Jenny
 Mother of Invention
 Doorstep Crime 999
 Tricks of the Tradesmen
 Secret Removers
 Big Bad World
 Fresh Meat
 Reflex
 Celebrity Bedlam
 Killer Magic
 The Real Hustle
 Extreme Cuisine (formerly ‘Gastronuts’)
 Police Academy UK
 Help my Teacher is Magic
 Tricks of the Tradesmen
 Kabadasses (Comedy Lab)
 Star Stories
 The Kevin Bishop Show
 Don't Get Screwed
 Science of Attraction
 Tool Academy UK
 Reggie Perrin
 Derren Brown: Mind Control
 Derren Brown: Trick of the Mind
 Derren Brown: Trick or Treat
 Derren Brown: The Events
 Derren Brown: Russian Roulette
 Derren Brown: Séance
 Derren Brown: Messiah
 Derren Brown: The Gathering
 Derren Brown: The Heist
 Derren Brown: Something Wicked This Way Comes
 Derren Brown: The System
 Derren Brown: Mind Reader – An Evening of Wonders
 Derren Brown: Hero at 30,000 Feet
 Derren Brown: Enigma
 Derren Brown: Miracles for Sale
 Derren Brown: Behind The Mischief
 Derren Brown Presents The 3D Magic Spectacular
Face the Clock
 50 Funniest Moments
 David Walliams: Awfully Good
 Great Movie Mistakes 2
 Great TV Mistakes
 The Greatest Xmas Moments of All Time
 The Greatest Xmas Adverts
 The Most Shocking Celebrity Moments of 2010
 Robert’s Web
 John Bishop’s Britain
 Meet The Parents
 Pete versus Life
 The Undercover Princesses
 The Undercover Princes
 Science of Scams
 The Greatest Ever 3D Moments
 The Justin Lee Collins Show
 TNT Show
 Dogface
 Balls of Steel
 Balls of Steel: The Stars Of The Future
 The Bulls**t Detective
 The Peter Serafinowicz Show
 TV Heaven, Telly Hell
 30 Greatest Political Comedies
 Tricks of the Bible
 Death Wish Live
 Bedsitcom
 Bad Robots

References

External links

Mass media companies of the United Kingdom
All3Media